Raymond or Ray Price may refer to:

 Raymond Price (rugby) (c. 1920–1988), Welsh rugby union and rugby league footballer of the 1940s and 1950s
 Ray Price (musician) (1926–2013), American country music singer-songwriter and guitarist
 Ray Price (speechwriter) (1930–2019), U.S. President Richard M. Nixon's chief speechwriter from 1969 to 1974
 Raymond A. Price (born 1933), Canadian geologist
 Ray Price (rugby) (born 1953), Australian rugby union and rugby league footballer of the 1970s and 1980s
 Ray Price (motorcyclist) (1937–2015) motorcycle drag racer, designer and engineer
 Ray Price (cricketer) (born 1976), Zimbabwean cricketer
 Ray Price (footballer), English footballer